The 2026 IIHF World Championship will be hosted by Switzerland from 15 to 31 May 2026, as the International Ice Hockey Federation (IIHF) announced on 27 May 2022 in Tampere, Finland.

Host nation bid 
The only bidders were Kazakhstan and Switzerland.

The Swiss were originally slated to host in 2020 but the tournament was canceled due to COVID-19 restrictions, but Kazakhstan hasn't hosted any tournaments.

In the end, on 27 May 2022, IIHF Congress awarded Switzerland rights to host the competition. No votes were needed, due to Kazakhstan's bid withdrawal earlier.

Venues

Participants 

 Qualified as hosts

References

2026 Men
2026 IIHF Men's World Ice Hockey Championships
2026 in ice hockey
Scheduled ice hockey competitions